The Moscow Conceptualist, or Russian Conceptualist, movement began with the Sots art of Komar and Melamid in the early 1970s, and continued as a trend in Russian art into the 1980s.  It attempted to subvert socialist ideology using the strategies of conceptual art and appropriation art. It was an artistic counterpoint to Socialist Realism, and the artists experimented aesthetically in a wide range of media, including painting, sculpture, performance, and literature.

The central figures were Dmitri Prigov, Ilya Kabakov, Irina Nakhova, Viktor Pivovarov, Eric Bulatov, Andrei Monastyrski and Komar and Melamid.

Mikhail Epstein, in After the Future: The Paradoxes of Postmodernism and Contemporary Russian Culture (1995) explains why conceptualism is particularly appropriate to the culture and history of Russia, but also how it differs from Western Conceptualism:

Epstein (1995) quotes Ilya Kabakov:

The Moscow Conceptualist artists faced difficulties exhibiting their work in the cultural atmosphere of the late Soviet Union. At the Manezh exhibit of 1962, which featured the work of many aesthetic precursors to the Moscow Conceptualists, then-Party first secretary Nikita Khrushchev excoriated the art and artists he saw there. In 1974, at the infamous Bulldozer Exhibition, many Moscow Conceptualist artists had their work destroyed when the Soviet authorities brought in bulldozers to clear the field in which the exhibition was held. The art movement was largely ignored outside of the Soviet Union, and within it, it was confined to a narrow circle of Moscow artists and their friends.

See also
Soviet Nonconformist Art
Neo-conceptual art

References
Epstein, Mikhail: After the Future: The Paradoxes of Postmodernism and Contemporary Russian Culture, Amherst: The University of Massachusetts Press, 1995.

External links
 Moscow Conceptualism. Russian Conceptual Art
 MOSCOW CONCEPTUALISM PRESENTED BY VADIM ZAKHAROV
 e-flux journal #29

Moscow Conceptualists
Moscow Conceptualists
Moscow Conceptualists
Conceptual art